The Soho Theatre is a theatre and registered charity in the Soho district of the City of Westminster, in London, England.  It produces and presents new works of theatre, together with comedy and cabaret, across three performance spaces.

The theatre has established itself as a vital launchpad for new artists and offers commissions, attachments and residencies for both emerging and established writers. It has launched the careers of numerous screenwriters and comedians in theatre, film, TV and radio.

The theatre's programme is a mix of comedy, cabaret and theatre, with a particular focus on new writing and alternative comedy.

Soho Theatre Company
The Soho Theatre Company was formed in 1969 by Verity Bargate and Fred Proud, and initially performed at a venue in Old Compton Street. Soon, the company moved to the Soho Poly, where it would remain for eighteen years. Sue Dunderdale was artistic director of the company for several years in the 1980s.

In 1990, the Soho Theatre Company entered a brief migrational period during which it visited the venues of the Royal Court Theatre, Riverside Studios, and the Institute of Contemporary Arts. The company was revitalised when it took up residence at the Cockpit Theatre of Marylebone from 1993 to 1995. During this period it expanded its Writers' Development programme, and premiered the works of over 35 new writers.

Soho Theatre on Dean Street
In 2000, the theatre moved to its current home on Dean Street. The purpose-built venue houses the 165-seat Main House, the 90-seat Studio, and the 140-seat Cabaret Space. The ground and lower-ground floors are also occupied by the Soho Theatre Bar.

Its current executive director is Mark Godfrey and its Creative Director is David Luff. Following his 2018 appointment as Creative Director, Soho Theatre has undertaken a re-investment in commissioning and producing new plays, moving towards a producer-led playhouse model. Their creative team is a tight-knit group of associates including Head of Comedy Steve Lock, Associate Directors Lakesha Arie-Angelo and Adam Brace, Touring Producer Sarah Dodd and their newly appointed Literary Manager, Gillian Greer.

In 2014, the theatre was fined £20,000 for a health and safety incident in which a stage manager, Rachael Presdee, was paralysed in a fall through an unmarked balcony door on to the stage some three metres below. Compensation of £3.7m was agreed with Miss Presdee.

The Verity Bargate Award
The Verity Bargate Award is Soho Theatre's flagship new writing award with the winning play produced in a full production on their stages. For almost 50 years, Soho Theatre has championed new writing and since 1982, the Verity Bargate Award has uncovered the best new and emerging writers. It has launched the careers of some of Britain's most established playwrights and screenwriters including Matt Charman (Bridge of Spies), Vicky Jones (Touch at Soho Theatre), Toby Whithouse (Doctor Who) and many, many more.

The 2020 award is judged by a panel of industry experts including former Soho writers Phoebe Waller-Bridge, Arinzé Kene and Laura Wade, screenwriter Russell T Davies, actress and playwright Lolita Chakrabarti and Character 7's Stephen Garrett.

The award was established in 1981–82 in memory of Verity Bargate, the founder and first artistic director of Soho Theatre.

Playwrights

Soho Poly period
Howard Brenton
Sue Townsend
Hanif Kureishi
Timberlake Wertenbaker
Tony Marchant
Pam Gems
Karim Alrawi
Barrie Keeffe
Brian Clarke
David Edgar
Mary O'Malley
Colin Spencer

Soho Theatre period
Phoebe Waller-Bridge
Vicky Jones
Phoebe Eclair-Powell
Theresa Ikoko
Gabriel Bissett-Smith
Jennifer Kidwell & Scott R. Sheppard
Arinzé Kene
Jessie Cave
Lucy McCormick
Maddie Rice
Sh!t Theatre
Ryan Calais Cameron
Dylan Coburn Gray
Iman Qureshi

Sources

External links
Soho Theatre Official website

Theatres in the City of Westminster
2000 establishments in England
Soho, London